The Château des Anglais is a ruined 12th century castle in the commune of Brengues in the Lot département of France. The ruins are privately owned. It has been listed since 1925 as a monument historique by the French Ministry of Culture.

See also
List of castles in France

References

External links
 

Ruined castles in Occitania (administrative region)
Monuments historiques of Lot (department)